Basaseachic Falls National Park is a national park located in the western side of the state of Chihuahua in the heart of the Sierra Madre Occidental mountain range.  The park is named after Basaseachic Falls (Cascada de Basaseachic) the second tallest waterfall in Mexico with a height of 246 meters (853 ft). Basaseachic Falls empties into Candameña Canyon (Barranca de Candameña)  which was carved by the Basaseachic River over millions of years. The park is known for its pine-oak forest, rock formations, and scenic views from high cliffs. Cliffs in the park reach an impressive height of 1,640 meters (5,380 ft).

History

Basaseachic Falls were discovered by Europeans sometime in the 18th century, becoming one of the most popular tourist attraction of the state of Chihuahua. The area of the present-day national park was inhabited by Tarahumara prior to the Spanish Colonial period. The etymology of the name "Basaseachic" originates from the Tarahumara language, Rarámuri meaning "place of the waterfall".

The first known European settlement in the area was Misión de Tomochi near the town of Cajurichi which was under the legal jurisdiction of the mission.  After the 18th century, the area attracted many settlers because of the discovery of abundant natural resources like minerals and high-quality wood.

Basaseachic Falls National Park was created by the Mexican federal government on February 2, 1981, by decree under president Jose Lopez Portillo. The park was defined to 5,803 hectares (14,340 acres) in the Sierra Madre Occidental along the surrounding area of the Basaseachic Falls and Barranca de Candameña.

Geography

The park is located in the subdivision of the Sierra Madre Occidental known as Sierra Tarahumara, near the municipality of Ocampo, Chihuahua. The dramatic topology was created by deep tectonic plate movements causing large fractures and rising rifts. The violent movement of the terrain resulted in deep canyons and high mountains. The present-day topology has been changed over thousands of years by wind erosion and the Basaseachic River.

The vertically pronounced walls of the Candameña Canyon can reach a height of 1,640 meters (5,380 ft); Candameña Canyon is known as one of the deepest canyons in the Sierra Tarahumara. The park includes two rivers: Duraznos River and Basaseachic River; both rivers feed into Basaseachic Falls that empties into the Candameña Canyon finally ending in the Candameña River.

Climate

The climate in the park changes depending on the elevation of the terrain. There are many microclimates in the park due to the different terrain. According to Köppen climate classification the following climates occur in the park.

Under 700 meters (2,296 ft) above sea level: BSh Semi-arid climate  with annual average minimum of 17 °C (63 °F) and maximum of 39 °C (103 °F). With a wet season in the late summer and fall.
From 700-1,300 meters (2,296-4,265 ft) above sea level: Cw'a Humid Subtropical climate with a high annual temperature reaching near 29 °C (84 °F) in the summer with a winter dry season mild temperatures rarely falling below  0 °C (32 °F). Monsoons come in the late summer and into the fall with an average 50 cm (20 in).
From 1,300-1,700 meters (4,265-7,218 ft) above sea  level: Cfa Humid Subtropical climate has warm humid summers and an average summer temperature of  20 °C (68 °F). The summer average precipitation is 70 cm (28 in) mostly in the months of: July, August, and September. From November to March there are many rainstorms and snowstorms caused by high elevation and prominent cold fronts.  Winter temperatures can reach a low of -16 °C (3 °F).
From 2,200-2,800 meters (7,217-9,186 ft) above sea level:Dfa Humid Continental climate has warm summers reaching a maximum temperature of 28 °C (82 °F) and summer lows of 10 °C (50 °F). Heavy rainstorms are observed from July to September.  Winters are cold reaching a maximum low of -20 °C (-4 °F) and a maximum high of -8 °C (17 °F). During the winter months, many snowstorms are observed with typically 1 meter (~3 ft) of snow per season.
Over 2,800 meters (9,186 ft) above sea level: Dfb Humid Continental climate is found only in the extremely high elevations of the peaks of the Sierra Madre Occidental. Summers are cool with temperatures rarely reaching 25 °C (77 °F) and summer lows fall below 10 °C (50 °F) regularly. There are heavy rainstorms from June to October. Winters are very cold with maximum high reaching 0 °C (32 °F) and reaching a maximum low of -31 °C (-24 °F). Winter snowstorms with high winds are common and typically over 1 meter (~3 ft) of snow per season.

Flora and fauna

The park has a great diversity in flora found in Northern Mexico. One of the factors that allows the park to have such a great variety of flora is due to the large number of microclimates found in the park due to dramatic terrain. The flora in the park like that found throughout the Sierra Madre Occidental mountain range varies with elevation. Pine (Pinus) and oak (Quercus) species are usually found at an elevation of 2,000 meters (6,560 ft) above sea level. The park contains 92 species of conifers and 76 species of oaks.  A large number of flora species in the following genus are observed in the park: Pinus, Quercus, Ficus, Vachellia, Ipomoea, Acacia, Lysiloma, Bursera, Vitex, Tabebuia, Sideroxylon, Cordia, Fouquieria, Pithecellobium.

The park also supports a large variety of fauna including a significant number of mammals, reptiles and birds. The mammals that can be found in the park include: Mexican fox squirrel (Sciurus nayaritensis), antelope jackrabbit (Lepus alleni), raccoon (Procyon lotor), hooded skunk (Mephitis macroura), wild boar (Sus scrofa), collared peccary (Pecari tajacu), white-tailed deer (Odocoileus virginianus), cougar (Puma concolor). The three main species of reptiles found in the park are: Texas horned lizard (Phrynosoma cornutum), rock rattlesnake (Crotalus lepidus), black-tail rattlesnake  (Crotalus molossus).

There is a great variety of birds observed in the park including: Mexican jay (Aphelocoma ultramarina), Steller's jay (Cyanocitta stelleri), acorn woodpecker (Melanerpes formicivorus), canyon towhee (Pipilo fuscus), mourning dove (Zenaida macroura), broad-billed hummingbird (Cynanthus latirostris), Montezuma quail (Cyrtonyx montezumae), mountain trogon (Trogon mexicanus), turkey Vulture (Cathartes aura). Trogon mexicanus'' is endemic species found in the mountains in Mexico; it is considered an endangered species and has symbolic significance to Mexicans.

References

External links
Reportaje turístico sobre la barranca de Candameña en la web de Méxicodesconocido.com

Protected areas of Chihuahua (state)
Protected areas of the Sierra Madre Occidental
National parks of Mexico
Sinaloan dry forests